Aleksandar "Aco" Apolonio (sometimes written Apolonijo) was a Serbian lawyer and politician who became a president of the self-proclaimed Dubrovnik Republic founded in October 1991. Apolonio was a resident of Dubrovnik and in the past had served as a public prosecutor there. He died in a refugee camp in Belgrade in 2001.

References

1916 births
2001 deaths
People from Herceg Novi
Croatian lawyers
Politicians of the Croatian War of Independence
Yugoslav lawyers